Huastecacris truncatipennis is a species of spur-throated grasshopper in the family Acrididae, found in Mexico.

References

External links

 

Melanoplinae